Motocultor Festival is an annual music festival which takes place in Brittany, north-west France, in mid-August, since 2007. The programme features a variety of heavy metal and hardcore acts. Notable artists who have performed at previous festivals include Pestilence, Destruction, Sodom, Entombed, Korpiklaani, Opeth, Shining, Punish Yourself, Dagoba, Koritni, Madball, Betraying the Martyrs and Loudblast.

References

External links

Music festivals in France
Heavy metal festivals in France
Music festivals established in 2007
2007 establishments in France